Glypican 2 (GPC2), also known cerebroglycan, is a protein which in humans is encoded by the GPC2 gene. The GPC2 gene is at locus 7q22.1 and encodes for a 579 amino acid protein. The C-terminus of GPC2 has the GPI attachment site, at G554, and the N-terminus encodes a signal peptide, from M1 to S24. Multiple GPC2 mRNA transcripts have been identified. GPC2-201 is the isoform overexpressed in pediatric cancers. Tumor-associated exon 3 of GPC2 shows the lowest expression in normal tissues compared with other exons.

Function 

Cerebroglycan is a glycophosphatidylinositol-linked integral membrane heparan sulfate proteoglycan found in the 
developing nervous system.  Cerebroglycan participates in cell adhesion and is thought to regulate the growth and guidance of axons. Cerebroglycan has especially high affinity for laminin-1.

Implications in cancer 
GPC2 has been suggested as a therapeutic target in neuroblastoma. GPC2 is highly expressed in about half of neuroblastoma cases and that high GPC2 expression correlates with poor overall survival.  GPC2 silencing inactivates Wnt/β-catenin signaling and reduces the expression of N-Myc, an oncogenic driver of neuroblastoma tumorigenesis. Chimeric antigen receptor (CAR) T cells and Immunotoxins (antibody-cytotoxin fusion proteins) targeting GPC2 inhibit neuroblastoma growth in mouse models. A GPC2 specific antibody drug conjugate (ADC) can also inhibit neuroblastoma cell proliferation. The CT3 monoclonal antibody specific for tumor-associated exons has been reported. Immunohistochemistry using the CT3 antibody shows its high tumor specificity. CT3-derived CAR T cells regress neuroblastoma in mice.

See also 
 Glypican

References

External links